Margaret Bradshaw MBE (born 1926) is a long term advocate and recorder of the exceptional flora of Upper Teesdale in County Durham, UK. Her first book was published when she was 97.

Margaret Elizabeth Bradshaw was born in 1926 and lived with her family on a farm in East Yorkshire and was interested in plants from childhood. She attended school in Bridlington and later in Leeds. After training as a teacher in Leeds, she taught in Derbyshire and then in Bishop Auckland. She has focused on the plants of Upper Teesdale since the 1950, recording locations of the unusual ones that are found there and on their conservation. In 1951 she identified  large-toothed Lady’s-mantle (Alchemilla subcrenata) in fields in Teesdale. She carried out research into the morphology and cytology of Lady’s-mantles as a student at Durham University and was awarded a PhD in 1959. She worked in the Department of Extra-Mural Studies at Durham University from 1962 to 1983.

In the late 1960s, as part of the protest against construction of Cow Green Reservoir, the national importance of the flora of the Upper Teesdale became better known. It includes species that are otherwise alpines and the Teesdale violet (Viola rupestris). The land remaining around the reservoir was designated as the Moor House-Upper Teesdale National Nature Reserve, combining two previous nature reserves. In 1983 she moved to a farm in Devonshire and was employed to study the local rare plants by the Nature Conservancy Council. She returned to Teesdale in 1998 and continued to monitor plant populations there, also leading local volunteers. She has travelled around the area on horseback in her later years.

In 1977 she was made MBE in the Queen's birthday honours for her services to conservation in Durham. In 2010 she was awarded honorary membership of the Botanical Society of Britain and Ireland. The whitebeam Sorbus margaretae, found in Devonshire, was named after her.

In 2012 Bradshaw was awarded the Marsh Botany Award in recognition of her lifetime contribution to the understanding and conservation of the Teesdale flora. In 2013, she was the recipient of the inaugural Pendlebury Award for her significant contribution to looking after the North Pennines Area of Outstanding Natural Beauty (AONB).

In 2023 Teesdale's Special Flora: Places, Plants and People was published. This is her first book, making her, at 97, the oldest first-published author.

Publications
 2023 Margaret E. Bradshaw Teesdale's Special Flora: Places, Plants and People Princetown University Press, 288 pp 
 2018 Margaret E. Bradshaw Chapter 5 Flora and Vegetation in The Natural History of Upper Teesdale edited by Durham Wildlife Trust.

References

1926 births
Living people
British botanists
Alumni of Durham University
Members of the Order of the British Empire